Anne or Ann Fisher may refer to:

Ann Fisher (grammarian) (1719–1778), author and grammarian
Anne B. Fisher (1898–1967), American writer 
Anne Fisher, wife of Charles Connell and sister of Lewis P. Fisher
Anne Fisher, character in Car of Dreams
Ann Fisher, WOSU-FM talk show host

See also
Ann Fisher-Wirth (born 1947), American poet and scholar
Anna Lee Fisher (born 1949), American chemist and astronaut
Annie Fischer (1914–1995), Hungarian pianist
Fisher (surname)